Alto Paranaíba is one of the ten planning regions of the state of Minas Gerais in Brazil.

Paranaiba is bordered:

 to the north and northeast by the north region of Minas Gerais
 to the east by Jequitinhonha-Mucuri
 to the southeast by the central region of Minas Gerais
 to the southwest by the central West region of Minas Gerais
 to the west by the northwest region of Minas Gerais

References

Geography of Minas Gerais